is a train station located in the city of Fukushima, Fukushima Prefecture, Japan operated by Fukushima Kōtsū.

Lines

Station layout
Soneda Station has one side platform serving a single bi-directional track. The ticket window is staffed in the morning and evening. There is a proof-of-departure ticket machine, a restroom, a beverage vending machine, a waiting room, and a flower shop located at the station. The station used to be capable of being used as a passing loop, however this is no longer possible due to the east-side track being decommissioned for through traffic.

History

1924, April 13 — Soneda Station opens along with the opening of the 
1962 — Dentetsu Fukushima Station is renamed to Soneda Station.
2010 — Soneda is repainted to have a red roof and cream walls in the image of the Tokyu 5000 series trains that ran on the Iizaka Line until 1991.

Adjacent stations

Surrounding area

See also
 List of railway stations in Japan

External links

  

Railway stations in Japan opened in 1924
Railway stations in Fukushima Prefecture
Fukushima Kōtsū Iizaka Line
Fukushima (city)